A scaphoid fracture is a break of the scaphoid bone in the wrist. Symptoms generally includes pain at the base of the thumb which is worse with use of the hand. The anatomic snuffbox is generally tender and swelling may occur. Complications may include nonunion of the fracture, avascular necrosis of the proximal part of the bone, and arthritis.

Scaphoid fractures are most commonly caused by a fall on an outstretched hand. Diagnosis is generally based on a combination of clinical examination and medical imaging. Some fractures may not be visible on plain X-rays. In such cases the affected area may be immobilised in a splint or cast and reviewed with repeat X-rays in two weeks, or alternatively an MRI or bone scan may be performed.

The fracture may be preventable by using wrist guards during certain activities. In those in whom the fracture remains well aligned a cast is generally sufficient. If the fracture is displaced then surgery is generally recommended. Healing may take up to six months.

It is the most commonly fractured carpal bone. Males are affected more often than females.

Signs and symptoms

People with scaphoid fractures generally have snuffbox tenderness.

Focal tenderness is usually present in one of three places: 1) volar prominence at the distal wrist for distal pole fractures; 2) anatomic snuff box for waist or midbody fractures; 3) distal to Lister's tubercle for proximal pole fractures.

Complications

Avascular necrosis (AVN) is one complication of scaphoid fracture. Since the scaphoid receives its arterial supply in a retrograde fashion (i.e. from distal to proximal pole), the part proximal to the fracture is usually affected.

Risk of AVN depends on the location of the fracture.
 Fractures in the proximal third have a high incidence of AVN (~30%)
 Waist fractures in the middle third is the most frequent fracture site and has moderate risk of AVN.
 Fractures in the distal third are rarely complicated by AVN.

Non union can also occur from undiagnosed or undertreated scaphoid fractures. Arterial flow to the scaphoid enters via the distal pole and travels to the proximal pole. This blood supply is tenuous, increasing the risk of nonunion, particularly with fractures at the wrist and proximal end. If not treated correctly non-union of the scaphoid fracture can lead to wrist osteoarthritis.

Symptoms may include aching in the wrist, decreased range of motion of the wrist, and pain during activities such as lifting or gripping. If x-ray results show arthritis due to an old break, the treatment plan will first focus on treating the arthritis through anti-inflammatory medications and wearing a splint when an individual feels pain in the wrist. If these treatments do not help the symptoms of arthritis, steroid injections to the wrist may help alleviate pain. Should these treatments not work, surgery may be required.

Mechanism 

Fractures of scaphoid can occur either with direct axial compression or with hyperextension of the wrist, such as a fall on the palm on an outstretched hand. Using the Herbert classification system, there are three main types of scaphoid fractures. 10%-20% of fractures are at the proximal pole, 60%-80% are at the waist (middle), and the remainder occur at the distal pole.

Diagnosis

Scaphoid fractures are often diagnosed using plain radiographs and multiple views are obtained as standard. However, not all fractures are apparent initially. Therefore, people with tenderness over the scaphoid (those who exhibit pain to pressure in the anatomic snuff box ) are often splinted in a thumb spica for 7–10 days at which point a second set of X-rays is taken. If a minimally displaced fracture was present initially, healing will now be apparent. Even then a fracture may not be apparent. A CT Scan can then be used to evaluate the scaphoid with greater resolution. The use of MRI, if available, is preferred over CT and can give one an immediate diagnosis.  Bone scintigraphy is also an effective method for diagnosis fracture which do not appear on Xray.

Treatment

Treatment of scaphoid fractures is guided by the location in the bone of the fracture (proximal, waist, distal), displacement (or instability) of the fracture, and patient tolerance for cast immobilization.

For non and minimally displaced fractures (up to 2mm) of the scaphoid waist, cast immobilisation (with surgical fixation for non-united fractures at 6 to 12 weeks) is as effective as immediate surgery fixation. This was demonstrated by the SWIFFT (Scaphoid Waist Internal Fixation for Fractures Trial) study, 439 patients were randomly allocated to either cast immobilisation or surgical fixation. There was no difference in the healing, pain and function or days off work between the two treatment groups, the cast immobilisation group had less complications and this treatment was more cost effective. The choice of short arm, short arm thumb spica or long arm cast is debated in the medical literature and no clear consensus or proof of the benefit of one type of casting or another has been shown; although it is generally accepted to use a short arm or short arm thumb spica for non displaced fractures.  In the SWIFFT study most used a short arm cast with the thumb left free. Non displaced or minimally displaced fracture can also be treated with percutaneous or minimal incision surgery which if performed correctly has a high union rate, low morbidity and faster return to activity than closed cast management. However this was not confirmed by the SWIFFT study.  

Fractures that are more proximal take longer to heal. It is expected the distal third will heal in 6 to 8 weeks, the middle third will take 8–12 weeks, and the proximal third will take 12–24 weeks. The Scaphoid receives its blood supply primarily from lateral and distal branches of the radial artery. Blood flows from the top/distal end of the bone in a retrograde fashion down to the proximal pole; if this blood flow is disrupted by a fracture, the bone may not heal. Surgery is necessary at this point to mechanically mend the bone together.

Percutaneous screw fixation is recommended over an open surgical approach when it is possible to achieve acceptable bone alignment closed as minimal incisions can preserves the palmar ligament complex and local vasculature, and help avoid soft tissue complications. This surgery includes screwing the scaphoid bone back together at the most perpendicular angle possible to promote quicker and stronger healing of the bone. Internal fixation can be done dorsally with a percutaneous incision and arthroscopic assistance  or via a minimal open dorsal approach, or via a volar approach in which case slight excavation of the edge of the trapezium bone may be necessary to reach the scaphoid as 80% of this bone is covered with articular cartilage, which makes it difficult to gain access to the scaphoid.

Epidemiology 
Fractures of the scaphoid are common in young males. They are less common in children and older adults because the distal radius is weaker contributor to the wrist and more likely to fracture in these age groups. Scaphoid fractures account for 50%-80% of carpal injuries.

Terminology
These are also called navicular fractures (the scaphoid also being called the carpal navicular), although this can be confused with the navicular bone in the foot.

References

External links 

 AAFP: Diagnosis and Management of Scaphoid Fractures
 Wheeless: Scaphoid fracture

Bone fractures
Injuries of wrist and hand
Wikipedia medicine articles ready to translate